Veľkrop is a village and municipality in Stropkov District in the Prešov Region of north-eastern Slovakia.

History
In historical records the village was first mentioned in 1408.

Geography
The municipality lies at an altitude of 293 metres and covers an area of 10.449 km². It has a population of about 221 people.

The Largest WW I cemetery in Slovakia 
The Club of Military History Beskydy finished its restoration work on the largest war cemetery in Slovakia in 2018. The cemetery is dated to the World War I. On Friday, September 28, 2018 it was made accessible to the public. 8862 soldiers of the Austro-Hungarian and Russian armies are buried there. The cemetery is restored in the same style as it was designed in the war times. Natural materials were used for the restoration which was  based on historical drawings and sketches that were preserved. The restoration of the cemetery  started in 2010 by more than 200 volunteers from Slovakia, Hungary, the Czech Republic, Poland, Ukraine and Romania. Out of the total number of buried soldiers, only 11 of them are known. Among the most important donors for the reconstruction are the Austrian Black Cross (German: Das Österreichisches Schwarzes Kreuz) as well as the Embassy of the Russian Federation in Slovakia. Currently, including the cemetery on the National Cultural Monuments List is being in the process of completion. The ground of the cemetery was sanctified by The Most Reverend Metropolitan Rastislav, Archbishop of Prešov, Metropolitan of the Czech Lands and Slovakia with the participation of the representatives of different religions. The author of the central monument is the landscape architect Marek Sobola. On the occasion of the sanctification of the cemetery, the first of The Tree of Peace (Quercus robur) was planted. The first tree was planted by Ing. Otto Jaus, Regional Director of the Black Cross of Vienna and Lower Austria and Col. Ing. Norbert Hríb from 2nd Mechanized Brigade of the Armed Forces of the Slovak Republic. The planted oak is in the “Concordia” variety, which in Latin means "harmony" and without harmony and determination of the volunteers, this cemetery could not have been restored. Concordia is a variety raised in Belgian nursery Van Geert in 1843 and It is truly a rare variety of oak. This is the first oak of this variety in North-East Slovakia Region.

References

External links
 
 

Villages and municipalities in Stropkov District